Ido is both a given name and a surname. Notable people with the name include:

Biblical prophet 
Iddo1, a minor biblical prophet from the Books of Chronicles in the Old Testament.

1 Note that because this is a Hebrew name transliterated into English, there is no difference between Iddo and Ido.

Given name 
 Ido Abram (born 1940), Dutch educationist
 Ido Bachelet, Israeli musician and scientist
 Ido Drent (born 1987), New Zealand actor
 Ido Exbard (born 1988), Israeli footballer
 Ido Kozikaro (born 1978), Israeli basketball player
 Ido Levy (born 1990), Israeli footballer
 Ido Mosseri (born 1978), Israeli actor
 Ido Nehoshtan (born 1957), Israeli military commander
 Ido Pariente (born 1978), Israeli martial artist
 Ido Zelkovitz (born 1979), Israeli historian

Surname 
, Japanese shogi player
 Jacky Ido (born 1977), Burkinabe-born French film actor
 Reizan Idō (1859–1935), Japanese writer
 Toshizō Ido (born 1945), governor of Hyōgo Prefecture in Japan
 Victor Ido (1869–1948), main alias of Indo (Eurasian) Dutch language writer and journalist Hans van de Wall

Japanese-language surnames